Dorudzan District is a district (bakhsh) in Marvdasht County, Fars Province, Iran. At the 2006 census, its population was 38,801, in 8,867 families.  The District has one city: Ramjerd. The District has three rural districts (dehestan): Abarj Rural District, Dorudzan Rural District, and Ramjerd-e Do Rural District.

References 

Marvdasht County
Districts of Fars Province